The  is a Japanese aerial lift line in Shōdoshima, Kagawa. The line opened in 1963. It runs through Kankakei, a gorge on Shōdoshima Island. The gorge is known for its unique view, made by diastrophisms and erosions.

Basic data
Distance: 
Vertical interval:

See also
List of aerial lifts in Japan

External links
 Official website

Aerial tramways in Japan
1963 establishments in Japan